The Masovian Voivodeship, also known as the Mazovia Province is a voivodeship (province) in east-central Poland, with its capital located in the city of Warsaw, which also serves as the capital of the country. Its principal cities are Warsaw (1.783 million) in the centre of the Warsaw metropolitan area, Radom (212,230) in the south, Płock (119,709) in the west, Siedlce (77,990) in the east, and Ostrołęka (52,071) in the north.

The province was created on 1 January 1999, out of the former voivodeships of Warsaw, Płock, Ciechanów, Ostrołęka, Siedlce and Radom, pursuant to the Polish local government reforms adopted in 1998. The province's name recalls the traditional name of the region, Mazovia, with which it is roughly coterminous. However, southern part of the voivodeship, with Radom, historically belongs to Lesser Poland, while Łomża and its surroundings, even though historically part of Mazovia, now is part of Podlaskie Voivodeship.

It is bordered by six other voivodeships: Warmian-Masurian to the north, Podlaskie to the north-east, Lublin to the south-east, Świętokrzyskie to the south, Łódź to the south-west, and Kuyavian-Pomeranian to the north-west.

Mazovian Voivodeship is the centre of science, research, education, industry and infrastructure in the country. It currently has the lowest unemployment rate in Poland and is classified as a very high income province. Moreover, it is popular among holidaymakers due to the number of historical monuments and greenery; forests cover over 20% of the voivodeship's area, where pines and oaks predominate in the regional landscape. Additionally, the Kampinos National Park located within Masovia is a UNESCO-designated biosphere reserve.

Administrative division
Masovian Voivodeship is divided into 42 counties, including 5 city counties and 37 land counties. These are subdivided into 314 gminas (municipilaties), which include 85 urban gminas.

The counties, shown on the numbered map, are described in the table below.

Cities and towns
The voivodeship contains 10 cities and 78 towns. These are listed below in descending order of population (according to official figures for 2019):

Politics 

The Masovian voivodeship's government is headed by the province's  (governor) who is appointed by the Polish Prime Minister. The current  of Masovia is Konstanty Radziwiłł.

The Sejmik of Masovia consists of 51 members.

Voivodes

2018 election

Protected areas

Protected areas in Masovian Voivodeship include one National Park and nine Landscape Parks. These are listed below.
Kampinos National Park (a UNESCO-designated biosphere reserve)
Bolimów Landscape Park (partly in Łódź Voivodeship)
Brudzeń Landscape Park
Bug Landscape Park
Chojnów Landscape Park
Górzno-Lidzbark Landscape Park (partly in Kuyavian-Pomeranian and Warmian-Masurian Voivodeships)
Gostynin-Włocławek Landscape Park (partly in Kuyavian-Pomeranian Voivodeship)
Kozienice Landscape Park
Masovian Landscape Park
Podlaskie Bug Gorge Landscape Park (partly in Lublin Voivodeship)

Historical

Masovian Voivodeship (1526–1795)

Masovia Voivodeship, 1526–1795 was an administrative region of the Kingdom of Poland, and of the Polish–Lithuanian Commonwealth, from the 15th century until the partitions of the Polish-Lithuanian Commonwealth (1795). Together with Płock and Rawa Voivodeships, it formed the province (prowincja) of Masovia.

Masovian Voivodeship (1816–1837)
Masovian Voivodeship was one of the voivodeships of Congress Poland. It was formed from Warsaw Department, and transformed into Masovia Governorate.

Transportation

There are three main road routes that pass through the voivodeship: Cork–Berlin–Poznań–Warszawa–Minsk–Moscow–Omsk, Prague–Wrocław–Warsaw–Białystok–Helsinki and Pskov–Gdańsk–Warsaw–Kraków–Budapest.

Currently, there are various stretches of autostrada in the area, with the A2 autostrada connecting the region, and therefore the capital city, with the rest of Europe. The autostrada passes directly through the voivodship from west to east, connecting it with Belarus and Germany. However, the A2 is yet to be built east of Warsaw to connect Poland with Belarus. The S8 expressway connects Warsaw with Białystok in the neighboring eastern province, along with the S17 being built to connect Warsaw with Lublin.

The railroad system is based on Koleje Mazowieckie and PKP Intercity.

The main international airport in the region is Warsaw Frederic Chopin Airport.

Economy
Masovian Voivodeship is the wealthiest province in Poland. The gross domestic product (GDP) of the province was €112.2 billion in 2018, accounting for 22.6% of the Polish economic output. GDP per capita adjusted for purchasing power was €34,400 or 114% of the EU27 average in the same year.

Unemployment 
The unemployment rate stood at 4.8% in 2017 and was higher than the national and the European average.

Gallery

See also 
 Warsaw Voivodeship (1919–1939)

References

External links 

 

 
1999 establishments in Poland
States and territories established in 1999